Doli may refer to:

 Doli (character), recurring character in Lloyd Alexander's fantasy series The Chronicles of Prydain
 Doli (musical instrument), a type of drum
 Doli, Croatia, a village near Dubrovnik, Croatia
 Doli (vehicle), a type of litter used in South Asia
 Doli (film), a 1969 Hindi movie starring Rajesh Khanna and Babita
 Doli Akhter, a Bangladeshi swimmer
 Shkelzen Doli, an Albanian violinist
 Dolu, Azerbaijan, a village in Astara District, Azerbaijan